Milaca Municipal Airport  is two miles northeast of City of Milaca, in Mille Lacs County, Minnesota.

Facilities
Its single grass runway, 16/34, is 2,900 by 150 feet (884 x 46 m).

In the year ending August 31, 2008 the airport had 8,000 general aviation aircraft operations, average 21 per day. 27 aircraft were then based at this airport: 96% single-engine and 4% ultralight.

References

External links 
 Aerial photo as of 21 April 1991 from USGS The National Map
 

Airports in Minnesota
Transportation in Mille Lacs County, Minnesota
Buildings and structures in Mille Lacs County, Minnesota